Edward Jewell may refer to:

 Edward Alden Jewell (1888–1947), New York Times art critic, American novelist
 Edward C. Jewell (1894–1963), American film art director